Tor polylepis is a species of cyprinid of the genus Tor. It inhabits China's Yunnan province. It is considered harmless to humans, and has been assessed as "data deficient" on the IUCN Red List.

References

Cyprinidae
Cyprinid fish of Asia
Freshwater fish of China
Fish described in 1996
IUCN Red List data deficient species